The 1946 AAA Championship Car season was the first season of American Championship car racing following World War II. After four years without racing in the United States, the AAA Contest Board was initially concerned about having enough races, enough entrants, and suitable equipment, for a 1946 season. Even the Indianapolis 500 was in doubt, as the Indianapolis Motor Speedway was neglected during the war. Track owner Eddie Rickenbacker sold the track to Tony Hulman in November 1945, by which point it had fallen into a terrible state of disrepair. As the season progressed, it proved to be a success, and marked a successful return of the National Championship. Hulman's swift and herculean effort to renovate Indianapolis allowed for the 1946 Indianapolis 500 to be run as scheduled on May 30, and it was won by George Robson.

George Robson and George Barringer were killed at Atlanta in the race. Al Putnam died at the Indiana State Fairgrounds Speedway in qualifying.

Background
Previously, only races of over 100 miles (160 km) on tracks one mile (1.6 km) or longer were able to hold National Championship events. Due to the concerns about the car counts and participation, the AAA Contest Board included a substantial number of "Big Car" races (today known as Sprint Cars) as part of the championship. The season officially consisted of 77 races (6 Champ Car races and 71 Big Car races), beginning at Mechanicsburg on April 14 and concluding at Richmond on November 10. Two non-points, exhibition races were also part of the calendar season.

After car counts were better than expected, some confusion arose over whether the 71 Big Car events still counted towards the National Championship. Some news publications of the time erroneously reported the points totals from only the six Champ Car events, implying - or simply assuming - that the Big Car races had been dropped. Nevertheless, despite all of the second-guessing and speculation, a full 77-race season was completed.

The Contest Board met after the season, and it was not until then which they declared the Big Car races would be dropped from the National Championship - effective for 1947. The ruling cemented the notion that the 71 Big Car races were indeed recognized as part of the official 1946 season. Furthermore, the prize money and 1947 car number assignments are consistent with the final points standings reflecting the full 77-race schedule.

Despite later publications suggesting the season was only six races (including official statistical publications released by the league decades later), historians firmly contend that the 1946 season should be recognized as the full 77-race schedule.

The AAA National Champion was Ted Horn, and the Indianapolis 500 winner was George Robson. Incidentally, Horn would have been declared the champion with or without the 71 "Big Car" races included, based on his points totals.

Schedule and results

 Scheduled for 100 miles, stopped early due to fatal accident involving George Robson and George Barringer.  Ted Horn was leading at the time of the accident, but after a protest, was found to have been involved in the accident and had his win stripped.

Note: Bill Holland started on the pole position in the Lakewood Race on July 4 and Ted Horn started on the pole position in the DuBois Race on July 20.

Leading National Championship standings

† Robson was killed in the race at Lakewood Speedway on September 2

Points system

Alternate schedule and results
The official IndyCar Series Historical Record Book (2011) listed only the six "Champ Car" in the schedule. (page 72)

  Scheduled for 100 miles, stopped early due to fatal accident involving George Robson and George Barringer.  Ted Horn was leading at the time of the accident, but after a protest, was found to have been involved in the accident and had his win stripped.
  No pole is awarded for the Pikes Peak Hill Climb, in this schedule on the pole is the driver who started first. No lap led was awarded for the Pikes Peak Hill Climb, however, a lap was awarded to the drivers that completed the climb.

Final points standings

Note: The points became the car, when not only one driver led the car, the relieved driver became small part of the points. Points for driver method: (the points for the finish place) / (number the lap when completed the car) * (number the lap when completed the driver)

References
 
 
 
 http://media.indycar.com/pdf/2011/IICS_2011_Historical_Record_Book_INT6.pdf  (p. 72, 315-316)

Notes

See also
 1946 Indianapolis 500

AAA Championship Car season
AAA Championship Car
1946 in American motorsport